Blaniulus guttulatus, commonly known as the spotted snake millipede is a species of millipede in the family Blaniulidae  that can be found in Central and Western Europe (except for Portugal). It has been introduced in North American countries such as the United States, Canada, Saint Helena, and Tristan da Cunha, as well as Tasmania and Norfolk Island, Australia.

Description
The spotted snake millipede is long and thin, with a whitish or cream-coloured body and conspicuous deep red spots (ozadenes) on each segment. It lacks eyes, and has short setae on the dorsal margin of each segment.

Ecology
This species is common in gardens and cultivated areas in Europe and North America, where it has become nearly ubiquitous. It feeds on sugar beets and other crops, and can become an agricultural pest in prolonged drought conditions. The species spends 3 years as a nymph. Males mature at an earlier stage than females.

References

Julida
Millipedes of Europe
Animals described in 1798
Taxa named by Louis Augustin Guillaume Bosc